A spruce is a tree of the genus Picea, a genus of about 35 species of coniferous evergreen trees in the family Pinaceae, found in the northern temperate and boreal (taiga) regions of the Earth. Picea is the sole genus in the subfamily Piceoideae. Spruces are large trees, from about 20 to 60 m (about 60–200 ft) tall when mature, and have whorled branches and conical form. They can be distinguished from other members of the pine family by their needles (leaves), which are four-sided and attached singly to small persistent peg-like structures (pulvini or sterigmata) on the branches, and by their cones (without any protruding bracts), which hang downwards after they are pollinated. The needles are shed when 4–10 years old, leaving the branches rough with the retained pegs. In other similar genera, the branches are fairly smooth.

Spruce are used as food plants by the larvae of some Lepidoptera (moth and butterfly) species, such as the eastern spruce budworm. They are also used by the larvae of gall adelgids (Adelges species).

In the mountains of western Sweden, scientists have found a Norway spruce, nicknamed Old Tjikko, which by reproducing through layering, has reached an age of 9,550 years and is claimed to be the world's oldest known living tree.

Description

Morphology

Determining that a tree is a spruce is not difficult; evergreen needles that are more or less quadrangled, and especially the pulvinus, give it away. Beyond that, determination can become more difficult. Intensive sampling in the Smithers/Hazelton/Houston area of British Columbia showed Douglas (1975), according to Coates et al. (1994), that cone scale morphology was the feature most useful in differentiating species of spruce; the length, width, length: width ratio, the length of free scale (the distance from the imprint of the seed wing to the tip of the scale), and the percentage free scale (length of free scale as a percentage of the total length of the scale) were most useful in this regard. Daubenmire (1974), after range-wide sampling, had already recognized the importance of the 2 latter characters. Taylor (1959) had noted that the most obvious morphological difference between typical Picea glauca and typical P. engelmannii was the cone scale, and Horton (1956,1959) found that the most useful diagnostic features of the 2 spruces are in the cone; differences occur in the flower, shoot and needle, "but those in the cone are most easily assessed" (Horton 1959). Coupé et al. (1982) recommended that cone scale characters be based on samples taken from the midsection of each of 10 cones from each of 5 trees in the population of interest.

Without cones, morphological differentiation among spruce species and their hybrids is more difficult. Species classification for seeds collected from spruce stands in which introgressive hybridization between white and Sitka spruces (P. sitchensis) may have occurred is important for determining appropriate cultural regimens in the nursery. If, for instance, white spruce grown at container nurseries in southwestern British Columbia are not given an extended photoperiod, leader growth ceases early in the first growing season, and seedlings do not reach the minimum height specifications. But, if an extended photoperiod is provided for Sitka spruce, seedlings become unacceptably tall by the end of the first growing season . Species classification of seedlots collected in areas where hybridization of white and Sitka spruces has been reported has depended on (i) easily measured cone scale characters of seed trees, especially free scale length, (ii) visual judgements of morphological characters, e.g., growth rhythm, shoot and root weight, and needle serration, or (iii) some combination of (i) and (ii) (Yeh and Arnott 1986). Useful to a degree, these classification procedures have important limitations; genetic composition of the seeds produced by a stand is determined by both the seed trees and the pollen parents, and species classification of hybrid seedlots and estimates of their level of introgression on the basis of seed-tree characteristics can be unreliable when hybrid seedlots vary in their introgressiveness in consequence of spatial and temporal variations in contributions from the pollen parent (Yeh and Arnott 1986). Secondly, morphological characters are markedly influenced by ontogenetic and environmental influences, so that to discern spruce hybrid seedlot composition with accuracy, hybrid seedlots must differ substantially in morphology from both parent species. Yeh and Arnott (1986) pointed out the difficulties of estimating accurately the degree of introgression between white and Sitka spruces; introgression may have occurred at low levels, and/or hybrid seed lots may vary in their degree of introgression in consequence of repeated backcrossing with parental species.

Growth 
Spruce seedlings are most susceptible immediately following germination, and remain highly susceptible through to the following spring. More than half of spruce seedling mortality probably occurs during the first growing season and is also very high during the first winter, when seedlings are subjected to freezing damage, frost heaving and erosion, as well as smothering by litter and snow-pressed vegetation. Seedlings that germinate late in the growing season are particularly vulnerable because they are tiny and have not had time to harden off fully.

Mortality rates generally decrease sharply thereafter, but losses often remain high for some years. "Establishment" is a subjective concept based on the idea that once a seedling has successfully reached a certain size, not much is likely to prevent its further development. Criteria vary, of course, but Noble and Ronco (1978), for instance, considered that seedlings 4 to 5 years old, or 8 cm to 10 cm tall, warranted the designation "established", since only unusual factors such as snow mold, fire, trampling, or predation would then impair regeneration success. Eis (1967) suggested that in dry habitats on either mineral soil or litter seedbeds a 3-year-old seedling may be considered established; in moist habitats, seedlings may need 4 or 5 years to become established on mineral soil, possibly longer on litter seedbeds.

Growth remains very slow for several to many years. Three years after shelterwood felling in subalpine Alberta, dominant regeneration averaged 5.5 cm in height in scarified blocks, and 7.3 cm in non-scarified blocks (Day 1970), possibly reflecting diminished fertility with the removal of the A horizon.

Taxonomy

Classification 
DNA analyses have shown that traditional classifications based on the morphology of needle and cone are artificial. A 2006 study found that P. breweriana had a basal position, followed by P. sitchensis, and the other species were further divided into three clades, suggesting that Picea originated in North America. The oldest record of spruce that has been found in the fossil record is from the Early Cretaceous (Valanginian) of western Canada, around 136 million years old.

Species
, Plants of the World Online accepted 37 species. The grouping is based on Ran et al. (2006).
Basal species:
 Picea breweriana – Brewer's spruce, Klamath Mountains, North America; local endemic
 Picea sitchensis – Sitka spruce, Pacific coast of North America; the largest species, to 95 m tall; important in forestry
Clade I (Northern and western North America, in boreal forests or high mountains)
 Picea engelmannii – Engelmann spruce, western North American mountains; important in forestry
 Picea glauca, syn. Picea laxa – white spruce, northern North America; important in forestry
Clade II (throughout Asia, mostly in mountainous areas, a few isolated populations in higher elevations of Mexico,)
 Picea brachytyla – Sargent's spruce, southwest China
 Picea chihuahuana – Chihuahua spruce, northwest Mexico (rare)
 Picea farreri – Burmese spruce, northeast Burma, southwest China (mountains)
 Picea likiangensis – Likiang spruce, southwest China
 Picea martinezii – Martinez spruce, northeast Mexico (very rare, endangered)
 Picea maximowiczii – Maximowicz spruce, Japan (rare, mountains)
 Picea morrisonicola – Taiwan spruce, Taiwan (high mountains)
 Picea neoveitchii – Veitch's spruce, northwest China (rare, endangered)
 Picea orientalis – Caucasian spruce or Oriental spruce, Caucasus, northeast Turkey
 Picea polita, syn. Picea torano – tiger-tail spruce, Japan
 Picea purpurea – purple cone spruce, western China
 Picea schrenkiana – Schrenk's spruce, mountains of central Asia
 Picea smithiana – morinda spruce, western Himalaya, eastern Afghanistan, northern and northwest India
 Picea spinulosa – Sikkim spruce, northeast India (Sikkim), eastern Himalaya
 Picea wilsonii – Wilson's spruce, western China
Clade III (Europe, Asia, and North America, mostly in boreal forests or mountainous areas)
 Picea abies – Norway spruce, Europe; important in forestry, the original Christmas tree
 Picea alcoquiana – ("P. bicolor") Alcock's spruce, central Japan (mountains)
 Picea asperata – dragon spruce, western China; several varieties
 Picea crassifolia – Qinghai spruce, China
 Picea glehnii – Glehn's spruce, northern Japan, Sakhalin
 Picea jezoensis – Jezo spruce, northeast Asia, Kamchatka south to Japan
 Picea koraiensis – Korean spruce, Korea, northeast China
 Picea koyamae – Koyama's spruce, Japan (mountains)
 Picea mariana – black spruce, northern North America
 Picea meyeri – Meyer's spruce, northern China (from Inner Mongolia to Gansu)
 Picea obovata – Siberian spruce, north Scandinavia, Siberia; often treated as a variant of P. abies (and hybridises with it), but has distinct cones
 Picea omorika – Serbian spruce, Serbia and Bosnia; local endemic; important in horticulture
 Picea pungens – blue spruce or Colorado spruce, Rocky Mountains, North America; important in horticulture
 Picea retroflexa – green dragon spruce, China
 Picea rubens – red spruce, northeastern North America; important in forestry, known as Adirondack in musical-instrument making
Others
 Picea aurantiaca Mast.
 Picea austropanlanica Silba
 Picea linzhiensis (W.C.Cheng & L.K.Fu) Rushforth
Hybrids
 Picea × albertiana S.Br.
 Picea × fennica (Regel) Kom.
 Picea × lutzii Little
 [[Picea × notha|Picea × notha]] Rehder

There is also an extinct species identified from fossil evidence, Picea critchfieldii which was widespread in the Southeastern United States in the Late Quaternary.

 Etymology 

The Polish phrase  ("from Prussia", a region now part of Poland) sounds to English ears like spruce. It can be argued that the word is actually derived from the Old French term , meaning literally Prussia.

 Ecology 

 Diseases 

 Sirococcus blight (Deuteromycotina, Coelomtcetes) 
The closely related species Sirococcus conigenus and Sirococcus piceicola cause shoot blight and seedling mortality of conifers in North America, Europe, and North Africa. Twig blight damage to seedlings of white and red spruces in a nursery near Asheville, North Carolina, was reported by Graves (1914). Hosts include white, black, Engelmann, Norway, and red spruces, although they are not the plants most commonly damaged. Sirococcus blight of spruces in nurseries show up randomly in seedlings to which the fungus was transmitted in infested seed. First-year seedlings are often killed, and larger plants may become too deformed for planting. Outbreaks involving < 30% of spruce seedlings in seedbeds have been traced to seed lots in which only 0.1% to 3% of seeds were infested. Seed infestation has in turn been traced to the colonization of spruce cones by S. conigenus in forests of the western interior. Infection develops readily if conidia are deposited on succulent plant parts that remain wet for at least 24 hours at 10 °C to 25 °C. Longer periods of wetness favour increasingly severe disease. Twig tips killed during growth the previous year show a characteristic crook.

 Rhizosphaera kalkhoffi needle cast Rhizosphaera infects white spruce, blue spruce (Picea pungens), and Norway spruces throughout Ontario, causing severe defoliation and sometimes killing small, stressed trees. White spruce is intermediately susceptible. Dead needles show rows of black fruiting bodies. Infection usually begins on lower branches. On white spruce, infected needles are usually retained on the tree into the following summer. The fungicide Chlorthalonil is registered for controlling this needle cast (Davis 1997).

 Valsa kunzei branch and stem canker 
A branch and stem canker associated with the fungus Valsa kunzei Fr. var. picea was reported on white and Norway spruces in Ontario (Jorgensen and Cafley 1961) and Quebec (Ouellette and Bard 1962). In Ontario, only trees of low vigour were affected, but in Quebec vigorous trees were also infected.

 Predators 

Small mammals ingest conifer seeds, and also consume seedlings. Cage feeding of deer mice (Peromyscus maniculatus) and red-backed vole (Myodes gapperi) showed a daily maximum seed consumption of 2000 white spruce seeds and of 1000 seeds of lodgepole pine, with the 2 species of mice consuming equal amounts of seed, but showing a preference for the pine over the spruce (Wagg 1963). The short-tailed meadow vole (Microtus pennsylvanicus Ord) voraciously ate all available white spruce and lodgepole pine seedlings, pulling them out of the ground and holding them between their front feet until the whole seedling had been consumed. Wagg (1963) attributed damage observed to the bark and cambium at ground level of small white spruce seedlings over several seasons to meadow voles.

Once shed, seeds contribute to the diet of small mammals, e.g., deer mice, red-backed voles, mountain voles (Microtus montanus), and chipmunks (Eutamias minimus). The magnitude of the loss is difficult to determine, and studies with and without seed protection have yielded conflicting results. In western Montana, for example, spruce seedling success was little better on protected than on unprotected seed spots (Schopmeyer and Helmers 1947), but in British Columbia spruce regeneration depended on protection from rodents (Smith 1955).

An important albeit indirect biotic constraint on spruce establishment is the depredation of seed by squirrels. As much as 90% of a cone crop has been harvested by red squirrels (Zasada et al. 1978). Deer mice, voles, chipmunks, and shrews can consume large quantities of seed; 1 mouse can eat 2000 seeds per night. Repeated applications of half a million seeds/ha failed to produce the 750 trees/ha sought by Northwest Pulp and Power, Ltd., near Hinton, Alberta (Radvanyi 1972), but no doubt left a lot of well-fed small mammals. Foraging by squirrels for winter buds (Rowe 1952) has not been reported in relation to young plantations, but Wagg (1963) noted that at Hinton AB, red squirrels were observed cutting the lateral and terminal twigs and feeding on the vegetative and flower buds of white spruce.

Red squirrels in Alaska have harvested as much as 90% of a cone crop (Zasada et al. 1978); their modus operandi is to cut off great numbers of cones with great expedition early in the fall, and then "spend the rest of the fall shelling out the seeds". In Manitoba, Rowe (1952) ascribed widespread severing of branch tips 5 cm to 10 cm long on white spruce ranging "from sapling to veteran size" to squirrels foraging for winter buds, cone failure having excluded the more usual food source. The damage has not been reported in relation to small trees, outplants or otherwise.

Porcupines (Erethizon dorsatum L.) may damage spruce (Nienstaedt 1957), but prefer red pine. Bark-stripping of white spruce by black bear (Euarctos americanus perniger) is locally important in Alaska (Lutz 1951), but the bark of white spruce is not attacked by field mice (Microtus pennsylvanicus Ord), even in years of heavy infestation.

 Pests 
The eastern spruce budworm (Choristoneura fumiferana) is a major pest of spruce trees in forests throughout Canada and the eastern United States. Two of the main host plants are black spruce and white spruce. Population levels oscillate, sometimes reaching extreme outbreak levels that can cause extreme defoliation of and damage to spruce trees. To reduce destruction, there are multiple methods of control in place, including pesticides.

Horntails, or Wood Wasps, use this tree for egg laying and the larvae will live in the outer inch of the tree under the bark.

Spruce beetles (Dendroctonus rufipennis) have destroyed swathes of spruce forest in western North America from Alaska to Wyoming.

 Uses 

Timber

Spruce is useful as a building wood, commonly referred to by several different names including North American timber, SPF (spruce, pine, fir) and whitewood (the collective name for spruce wood). Spruce wood is used for many purposes, ranging from general construction work and crates to highly specialised uses in wooden aircraft. The Wright brothers' first aircraft, the Flyer, was built of spruce.

Because this species has no insect or decay resistance qualities after logging, it is generally recommended for construction purposes as indoor use only (indoor drywall framing, for example). Spruce wood, when left outside cannot be expected to last more than 12–18 months depending on the type of climate it is exposed to.

Pulpwood
Spruce is one of the most important woods for paper uses, as it has long wood fibres which bind together to make strong paper. The fibres are thin walled and collapse to thin bands upon drying. Spruces are commonly used in mechanical pulping as they are easily bleached. Together with northern pines, northern spruces are commonly used to make NBSK. Spruces are cultivated over vast areas as pulpwood.

Food and medicine

The fresh shoots of many spruces are a natural source of vitamin C. Captain Cook made alcoholic sugar-based spruce beer during his sea voyages in order to prevent scurvy in his crew. The leaves and branches, or the essential oils, can be used to brew spruce beer.

In Finland, young spruce buds are sometimes used as a spice, or boiled with sugar to create spruce bud syrup. In survival situations spruce needles can be directly ingested or boiled into a tea. This replaces large amounts of vitamin C. Also, water is stored in a spruce's needles, providing an alternative means of hydration . Spruce can be used as a preventive measure for scurvy in an environment where meat is the only prominent food source .

Tonewood
Spruce is the standard material used in soundboards for many musical instruments, including guitars, mandolins, cellos, violins, and the soundboard at the heart of a piano and the harp.
Wood used for this purpose is referred to as tonewood.

Spruce, along with cedar, is often used for the soundboard/top of an acoustic guitar. The main types of spruce used for this purpose are Sitka, Engelmann, Adirondack and European spruces.

Other uses

Native Americans in North America use the thin, pliable roots of some species for weaving baskets and for sewing together pieces of birch bark for canoes. See also Kiidk'yaas for an unusual golden Sitka Spruce sacred to the Haida people.

Spruces are popular ornamental trees in horticulture, admired for their evergreen, symmetrical narrow-conic growth habit. For the same reason, some (particularly Picea abies and P. omorika) are also extensively used as Christmas trees, with artificial Christmas trees often being produced in their likenesses.

Spruce branches are also used at Aintree racecourse, Liverpool, to build several of the fences on the Grand National course. Spruce wood is also used to make sculptures.

 Genome 
The nuclear, mitochondrial and chloroplast genomes of British Columbia interior spruce have been sequenced. The large (20 Gbp) nuclear genome and associated gene annotations of interior spruce (genotype PG29) were published in 2013 and 2015.

References

External links

theplantlist.org / Picea (Spruce)
conifers.org / Gymnosperm Database - Picea
efloras.org / Picea
pinetum.org / Arboretum de Villardebelle: Cones of selected species of Picea'': page 1, Arboretum de Villardebelle page 2